In numerical analysis and scientific computing, the backward Euler method (or implicit Euler method) is one of the most basic numerical methods for the solution of ordinary differential equations. It is similar to the (standard) Euler method, but differs in that it is an implicit method. The backward Euler method has error of order one in time.

Description 

Consider the ordinary differential equation 
 
A numerical method produces a sequence  such that  approximates , where  is called the step size.

The backward Euler method computes the approximations using
 

The backward Euler method is an implicit method: the new approximation  appears on both sides of the equation, and thus the method needs to solve an algebraic equation for the unknown . For non-stiff problems, this can be done with fixed-point iteration:

If this sequence converges (within a given tolerance), then the method takes its limit as the new approximation
.

Alternatively, one can use (some modification of) the Newton–Raphson method to solve the algebraic equation.

Derivation 

 
Now approximate the integral on the right by the right-hand rectangle method (with one rectangle):
 
Finally, use that  is supposed to approximate  and the formula for the backward Euler method follows.

The same reasoning leads to the (standard) Euler method if the left-hand rectangle rule is used instead of the right-hand one.

Analysis 

It means that this method  has order one. In general, a method with  LTE (local truncation error) is said to be of kth order.

The region of absolute stability for the backward Euler method is the complement in the complex plane of the disk with radius 1 centered at 1, depicted in the figure. This includes the whole left half of the complex plane, making it suitable for the solution of stiff equations. In fact, the backward Euler method is even L-stable.

The region for a discrete stable system by Backward Euler Method is a circle with radius 0.5 which is located at (0.5, 0) in the z-plane.

Extensions and modifications 

The backward Euler method is a variant of the (forward) Euler method. Other variants are the semi-implicit Euler method and the exponential Euler method.

The backward Euler method can be seen as a Runge–Kutta method with one stage, described by the Butcher tableau:

The method can also be seen as a linear multistep method with one step. It is the first method of the family of Adams–Moulton methods, and also of the family of backward differentiation formulas.

See also
Crank–Nicolson method

Notes

References 
 .

Numerical differential equations
Runge–Kutta methods